Yeshiva Aharon Yaakov - Ohr Eliyahu (YAYOE) is a private Orthodox Jewish day school located in the Fairfax District of Los Angeles, California.

History
Ohr Eliyahu Academy, originally called the Emanuel Streisand School of the Pacific Jewish Center, was founded in the mid-1980s in Venice, California. As the school grew, Ohr Eliyahu relocated to a former Culver City public school near Kenneth Hahn State Park. After leasing the site for four years the school purchased the campus for $1.4 million in 1999.

New Campus
In April 2009, Yeshiva Aharon Yaakov - Ohr Eliyahu bought the former Daniel Murphy Catholic High School campus, located in the heavily Orthodox Jewish populated Fairfax District. The old site was sold and is now the Stoneview Nature Conservancy.

The 2010-2011 school year marked the beginning of YAYOE's use of its newly remodeled  campus.

Curriculum
YAYOE offers a dual curriculum with both secular and Judaic studies for students from kindergarten through eighth grade with separate boys and girls divisions.  Originally, a majority of the Judaic studies program was taught in Hebrew, but this is no longer the case. However, Hebrew is still taught as a subject.  The Yeshiva's outlook and curriculum are based upon the philosophies of the Chofetz Chaim movement of Rabbi Henoch Leibowitz.  The Principal, Rabbi Shlomo Goldberg, was a student of Rabbi Leibowitz, and many of the Judaic Studies Rabbis studied at Chofetz Chaim Yeshiva.

The school has music and art programs and various after-school enrichment electives.

YAYOE is accredited by the Bureau of Jewish Education and the Western Association of Schools and Colleges.

Administration
Headmaster: Rabbi Shlomo Goldberg

Torah Studies Principal: Mrs. Malca Schwarzmer

General Studies Principal: Position split among various members of the staff

Awards
Torah Umesorah awarded the school and Rabbi Shlomo Goldberg the Hersh Potok Memorial School of the Year Award and the Maurice and Goldie Rothman Award for Outstanding Educator respectively.

References

External links
 

Jewish day schools in California
Private middle schools in California
Private elementary schools in California
Orthodox Judaism in Los Angeles